Obrše is a small settlement north of Lukovica pri Domžalah in the eastern part of the Upper Carniola region of Slovenia.

References

External links

Obrše on Geopedia

Populated places in the Municipality of Lukovica